Canada House is an Art Nouveau-style office building on Chepstow Street in Manchester, England. Constructed originally as a packing warehouse, the building opened in 1909. Designed by local architects W & G Higginbottom (brothers Walter and George Harry Higginbottom), the building has features consistent with art nouveau and has a terracotta exterior.

Canada House is one of many warehouses in Manchester alongside Watts Warehouse, Asia House, India House and Churchgate House. Canada House is a Grade-II listed building.

The building was extensively renovated during the 1990s. Tenants of Canada House include English Heritage who have their North West office at the building, sportwear company Puma, Omnicom Agency The Marketing Arm, Anderton Gables Project & Building Consultancy and a Bannatyne Health Club.

See also

Listed buildings in Manchester-M1

References

Commercial buildings in Manchester
Office buildings in Manchester
Warehouses in England
Commercial buildings completed in 1909
Industrial buildings completed in 1909
Grade II listed buildings in Manchester
Grade II listed commercial buildings
Grade II listed industrial buildings
Grade II listed office buildings
Art Nouveau commercial buildings
Art Nouveau architecture in Manchester